Brent Saunders is an American biopharma executive and entrepreneur.  He is known for his merger and acquisition activity, having helped oversee the merger between pharmaceutical companies Merck and Schering-Plough, the acquisition of Bausch + Lomb by Valeant Pharmaceuticals, and the $63 billion acquisition of Allergan by Abbvie. He is the founder of special-purpose acquisition company (SPAC) Vesper Healthcare Acquisition. Saunders is also executive chairman of medical aesthetics companies The Beauty Health Company and Hugel America.

Early life and education

He grew up in the South Whitehall area of Pennsylvania, with a twin brother Wayne and sister Reed. He graduated from Parkland High School in 1988. He attended the University of Pittsburgh and served as president of the Student Government Board. He graduated in 1992 with a bachelor's degree in economics and East Asian studies. In 1996, he received an M.B.A. degree and a J.D. degree from Temple University.

Career
In 1996, while attending law school, Saunders started working part time at Jefferson Health as a compliance officer.

In 2000, Saunders joined PricewaterhouseCoopers as a healthcare compliance manager, and became partner and head of the firm's compliance business advisory services group.

In October 2003, Saunders was hired as senior vice president of global compliance and business practices at pharmaceutical company Schering-Plough.

In mid-2007, he became president of consumer health care at Schering-Plough, with responsibility for a business unit of products including Coppertone, Dr. Scholl's and Claritin.

In 2009, while still president of consumer health care, Saunders was selected to lead the integration team of Schering-Plough's merger with Merck.

In 2010, Saunders was appointed CEO of eye care company Bausch + Lomb.

In 2013, as CEO of Bausch + Lomb, he oversaw its acquisition by Valeant Pharmaceuticals (now known as Bausch Health) for $8.7 billion. He joined Valeant in an advisory role to assist with the transition. In October, Saunders joined pharmaceutical company Forest Laboratories as CEO.

In May 2014, Saunders was named CEO of pharmaceutical company Actavis, after that company acquired Forest Laboratories. In November, Saunders negotiated Actavis' merger with fellow pharmaceutical company Allergan, which closed at $70.5 billion. The new combined company took the Allergan name.

In February 2015, Saunders appeared on the cover of Forbes, named as Wall Street's Drug Dealer.

In May 2019, Saunders survived a proposal brought by hedge fund Appaloosa Management to split Allergan's chairman and CEO roles. In June, pharmaceutical company Abbvie bought Allergan for $63 billion.

In June 2020, Saunders joined the board of BridgeBio Pharma, a company that had an IPO in 2019. In September, Saunders’ special-purpose acquisition company Vesper Healthcare Acquisition publicly launched, raising $400 million. Filings indicated that Saunders owned 20% of the company after the SPAC sale. In December, Saunders made his first deal with Vesper when he acquired HydraFacial, a beauty treatment company, for $1.1 billion. 

In May 2021, Vesper's HydraFacial deal closed, and the new company was renamed The Beauty Health Company, with Saunders taking the role of executive chairman. He also served as interim CEO until February 2022. In June 2022, Saunders was named to the board of medical aesthetics company Hugel America, an arm of South Korea-based Hugel Inc.

References 

American chief executives
1970 births
Living people